The following is a list of episodes for the British fly-on-the-wall documentary series, The Family.  The series is a revival of the original series of the same name that first aired in 1974.

, 24 episodes of The Family have aired.

Series overview

Episodes

Series 1: The Hughes (2008)
Series 1 followed the lives of the Hughes family consisting of parents Simon and Jane, and their four children – Jessica (22), Emily (19), Charlotte (17), and Tom (14) who live in Harbledown, Canterbury, Kent. They had more than 20 cameras placed in their semi-detached home, capturing their every move over a period of four months and were controlled from the house next door.

Series 2: The Grewals (2009)
Series 2 followed the lives of the Grewals, a British Indian family consisting of parents Arvinderjeet and Sarbjit, and their three children – Mandeep (33), Gurdip (32), and Tejind (23) along with Mandeep and Gurdip's spouses – Gursharonjit (24) and Jitender (36), respectively, who live in West London. The format differed slightly from the first series in that micro-interviews with family members were interspersed periodically throughout the programme, commenting about the issue in the episode.

Series 3: The Adesinas (2010)
Series 3 followed the lives of the Adesinas, a Nigerian British family consisting of parents Sunday and Vicky, and their four British children – Ayo (27), Julie (25), Olu (23), and Ola (15) who live in Hackney, East London.

Ratings

Series 1: The Hughes
Episode 1 – 2.7 Million

Episode 2 – 2.2 Million

Episode 3 – 1.5 Million

Episode 4 – 2.0 Million

Episode 5 – 1.7 Million

Episode 6 – 2.0 Million

Episode 7 – 1.8 Million

Episode 8 – 2.2 Million

Christmas Special – 1.36 Million

References

External links
The Family information at Channel 4 online

Lists of British non-fiction television series episodes